Rémy, Remy, Rémi or Remi is a name of French origin, and is associated with the Latin name Remigius. It is used as either a surname or as a male or female given name. 

People with the name Remy include:

Given name 

 Saint Rémy or Saint Remigius (437–533), baptised Clovis I, King of the Franks
 Achille Rémy Percheron (1797–1869), French entomologist
 Jean Rémy Ayouné, former foreign minister of Gabon
 Jean-Rémy Bessieux, Roman Catholic missionary and bishop
 Jean-Rémy Moët, French wine merchant, ran the Moët et Chandon house founded by his grandfather
 Caroline Rémy de Guebhard, French writer
 Nicolas Rémy Maire, French bowmaker
 Rémy Vincent Andrianjanaka, Malagasy politician
 Rémy Belleau, French renaissance poet 
 Rémy Belvaux, Belgian actor
 Remy Bonjasky (born 1976), Suriname-born Dutch professional K-1 kickboxer
 Rémy Cabella, French footballer
 Rémy Card, French Linux software developer
 Rémi Casty (born 1985), French rugby league footballer
 Rémy Ceillier (1688–1761), French Benedictine monk and historian
 Remy Charlip (1929-2012), American children's book author and illustrator
 Rémy Couvez, French musician who plays the hurdy-gurdy
 Remy de Gourmont (1858–1915), French writer
 Rémy Désilets, Québécois politician
 Rémy Di Gregorio (born 1985), French professional cyclist
 Remy Gardner, Australian Motorcycle Racer
 Rémy Girard, Québécois actor
 Remy Hamilton (born 1974), American football kicker
 Remy Hermoso (born 1947), Venezuelan Major League Baseball shortstop
 Remy Hii, Malaysian actor
 Rémy Jacques (1817–1905), French lawyer and politician.
 Remy Keo, Cambodian politician
 Rémy Julienne, French stunt performer
 Remy LaCroix, adult film actress
 Remi Lindholm (born 1998), Finnish cross-country skier
 Remy Ma, stagename of Reminisce Smith (born 1980) an American female rapper
 Rémy Maertens, Belgian tug of war competitor who competed in the 1920 Summer Olympics
 Remy Martin (basketball) (born 1998), American basketball player
 Rémy Martin (rugby union), French rugby union flanker
 Remy Munasifi, Arab American stand-up comedian, parody musician and video artist
 Rémy Noë (born 1974), English painter of French-Dutch descent
 Remy Ong, Singaporean bowling champion
 Rémy Pflimlin (1954–2016), French media executive
 Rémy Pointereau, French politician
 Remy Presas, Filipino martial artist
 Remy P. Presas, American martial artist
 Rémy Raffalli, French World War II soldier
 Rémy Riou (1987), French soccer goalkeeper
 Remy Ryan, American actress
 Remy Shand, Canadian R&B/Soul artist
 Rémy Trudel, Canadian politician
 Rémy Vercoutre, Soccer goalkeeper
 Remy Wellen, German ice hockey forward
 Remy Zaken, American actress
 Rémy Zaugg, Swiss painter
 Rémy (rapper) (born 1997), French Rapper

Surname 

 Alfred Remy, German-born American philologist and music theorist
 Daniel de Rémy de Courcelle (1626–1698), Governor General of New France
 Jack Remy, pornographic actor
 Jacques Rémy, French soccer striker
 Jean Rémy, French colonel and member of the Free French during World War II
 Jerry Remy (1952–2021), American Major League Baseball player and Boston Red Sox broadcaster
 Joseph Rémy, Belgian boxer
 Loïc Rémy, French football striker
 Ludger Rémy (1949–2017), German harpsichordist, conductor, musicologist
 Nicholas Rémy, a French magistrate who became famous as a hunter of witches
 Patrick Rémy (skier), French cross-country skier
 Patrick Remy (footballer), French soccer striker and manager
 Paul Rémy, French-Algerian tennis player
 Pierre-Jean Rémy, French author and diplomat
 Raoul Rémy, French professional cyclist
 Sébastien Rémy, Luxembourgian soccer midfielder
 Sylvain Remy, Beninese soccer defender
 William Rémy, French soccer defender

Fictional characters 

 Remy Danton, a character on the Netflix series House of Cards
 Remi Briggs, also known as 'Jane Doe', a main character played by Jamie Alexander in the NBC TV series Blindspot
 Remy Scott, an FBI agent character played by Dylan McDermott in FBI Most Wanted
 Remy, from the animated television series Big City Greens
 Remy (Ratatouille), a four Michelin star–holding rat chef, and protagonist of Ratatouille (film) and Ratatouille the Musical Remy Baudouin, a character in The Young Indiana Jones Chronicles Remy Buxaplenty from The Fairly OddParents Dr. Remy "Thirteen" Hadley, a character on the television series House, M.D. Remy, a character in the movie Higher Learning Rémy Legaludec, a character in the novel The Da Vinci Code Remy Marathe, a fictional member of Les Assassins des Fauteuils Rollents, a Québécois separatist group in the 1996 novel Infinite Jest Remy (Street Fighter), a video game character
 Gambit (Marvel Comics), real name Remy LeBeau, from X-Men comics
 Remy Starr, a fictional character in Sarah Dessen's 5th novel This Lullaby Remy, the landlord in the television series New Girl Detective Lieutenant Remy McSwain, a character played by Dennis Quaid in the film The Big Easy Remi Delatour on the television series Devious Maids Remi Puguna from Promare Remi Hoshikawa, Five Yellow, from Chikyu Sentai Fiveman Rémi the orphan boy, main character of the popular 1878 French novel Sans Famille by Hector Malot
 Remi, father of Otis, in the Netflix series Sex Education''

 Remy Bones, a skeleton chef, in the Disney Junior television series Vampirina.

See also 
 Remi (disambiguation)
 Remy (disambiguation)
 Gilbert Renault, French Resistance fighter and author whose aliases include Rémy and Colonel Rémy
 

English unisex given names
French masculine given names
French-language surnames